
Gmina Pszczew is a rural gmina (administrative district) in Międzyrzecz County, Lubusz Voivodeship, in western Poland.

The gmina contains part of the protected area called Pszczew Landscape Park.

Villages
Gmina Pszczew contains the villages and settlements of Biercza, Błotnia, Borowy Młyn, Brzeźno, Janowo, Nowe Gorzycko, Policko, Pszczew, Rańsko, Rańsko-Leśniczówka, Silna, Stoki, Stołuń, Świechocin, Szarcz, Wrony and Zielomyśl.

Neighbouring gminas
Gmina Pszczew is bordered by the gminas of Miedzichowo, Międzychód, Międzyrzecz, Przytoczna and Trzciel.

Twin towns – sister cities

Gmina Pszczew is twinned with:
 Canaro, Italy
 Letschin, Germany

References

Pszczew
Międzyrzecz County